CJ Carella's WitchCraft, or more informally WitchCraft, is a modern horror role-playing game published by Eden Studios, Inc. It is based on the Unisystem game system and had been previously published by Myrmidon Press. In both cases it was designed and written by C. J. Carella.  WitchCraft was the first RPG to use the Unisystem game system.

Setting
Player characters can take on the role of various types of magic-using humans known as the "Gifted". Other characters can be "Lesser Gifted" (less magically capable, but have more mundane skills), the "Mundane" (non-magical humans) or even various supernatural races such as Vampires, Spirits, or Bast (intelligent shape-shifting cats). There are several different associations (called Covenants) described in the main rulebook, and several more in the supplements. Some of the Covenants, such as the divinely inspired Sentinels, fight centuries-long battles, both in open war and more subtle battles of intrigue and magic. Other Covenants, such as the Rosicrucians and Cabal of Psyche are mutual aid societies, but even these neutral societies are being drawn into the fight to stop or delay the "Reckoning". Precisely what the Reckoning is no one can say, but more and more Gifted and Supernatural beings are rising with every passing year, and what is at stake may well be the whole of reality.

WitchCraft draws heavily on modern Neo-Paganism and its practices, with the caveat that while it does this, it in no way espouses one belief system over the other.  WitchCraft features a creator deity, although the exact nature of the creator is left undefined.  The WitchCraft setting includes dreamworlds, fae creatures, versions of werecreatures and vampires and many other things inspired by a wide range of mythology.

WitchCraft, like all Unisystem games, is quite dangerous in combat, and as such the game promotes more of a thinking approach to problem solving than some other RPGs. The magic system breaks into several types of metaphysical arts including Magic, Seer (psychic) powers, Necromancy, Divine Miracles, and others which are defined in supplements.

Many comparisons have been drawn between WitchCraft and the World of Darkness games, in particular Mage. Both games feature magic using creatures in a horror influenced contemporary setting, though there are many differences.  The system used in Eden's Buffy the Vampire Slayer RPG is heavily modeled after WitchCraft. The Buffy core book even gives advice on how to convert Buffy characters to WitchCraft characters.

Associations

There are various associations or "Covens" to which the player characters can belong, but this is not required of any character.
The Wicce The witches of the modern world. They are numerous and diverse but all share some common goals and desires.
The Rosicrucians The upper crust of the magical world.  Conflict between the Rosicrucians and the Wicce are common story threads.
Society of Sentinels The Holy Warriors. Gathered from the three great religions the Sentinels fight a holy war against all supernatural creatures.
The Cabal of Psyche A hidden group of psychics that remember the witch trials all too well and do their best to keep them from happening again.
The Solitaires Unaligned Gifted and Lesser Gifted that do not belong to any Association or group.

Two other Associations that are not Associations are:
The Combine The proverbial "Other", the ones that are behind the scenes pulling the strings or working with the Government. Believed to be out to destroy all magical beings, but the truth is no one knows for sure who they are or what they are doing.
The Mundanes Everyone else. They have no magic and are largely ignorant of the magical world, but they outnumber the magical beings tens of thousands to one so they are a force to be reckoned with.

System

WitchCraft was the first Unisystem game published.  Like all Unisystem games, WitchCraft uses a point-buy system to generate characters. Points are then spent on Attributes, Skills, Qualities and Metaphysics. Drawbacks can then be used to gain extra points.

Attributes represent the character's main six abilities, which in this case are three physical attributes: Strength, Dexterity, Constitution; and three mental attributes: Intelligence, Perception, Willpower.  Characters also have a variety of skills, and Qualities and Drawbacks to give the character added perks or faults (respectively).  Other Qualities and Drawbacks are of a Supernatural sort and are used to designate a character as a particular type of character (Gifted, Bast, Spirit, and so on) or detail what sort of magic they can do.

Actions are resolved by adding together a player's relevant attribute and skill to a ten-sided die roll and any modifiers for difficulty; if the total is nine or greater, the action succeeds.

Supplements
Mystery Codex The first supplement to WitchCraft. Details more Spirit and Undead types, expanded information on Vampyres, includes the Storm Dragon and Pariah Associations, and expanded Metaphysics.
Abomination Codex Introduces the Knights Templar, Voodoo, True Immortals, as well as expanded rules for Ferals (were-creatures) and more Metaphysics.
Power and Privilege The first Association sourcebook details the Brotherhood of the Rose Cross (Rosicrucians).
Book of Hod The first Sephiroth book details Hod, the land of Dreams.
Honor and Blood UNPUBLISHED. Details Yosod, the Society of the Sentinels, the angels and the demons.
Grace and Guidance UNPUBLISHED. Details the Storm Dragons.
Book of Geburah UNPUBLISHED. Details Geburah, the land of the Dead.

Reviews
Arcane No. 15 (January 1997)

References

External links
Eden's WitchCraft Page
List of WitchCraft books at Pen & Paper RPG Database.
Interview with CJ Carella

Eden Studios games
Horror role-playing games
Role-playing games introduced in 1999
Dark fantasy role-playing games